Russula abietina is a species of mushroom. The cap ranges from 3 to 7 cm wide, and is pink, purple or brown, with a darker red center. The odor and taste are mild. Its edibility is unknown, but it is too small to be of interest. The spores are yellow, subglobose, and slightly bumpy. Similar species include Russula cessans and Russula queletii.

References 

abietina
Fungi described in 1902
Taxa named by Charles Horton Peck